Nuritamburia is a genus of moths belonging to the subfamily Tortricinae of the family Tortricidae.

Species
Nuritamburia chlorocalla (Walsingham, in Sharp, 1907)
Nuritamburia metallurgica (Walsingham, in Sharp, 1907)
Nuritamburia phyllanthana (Swezey, 1940)
Nuritamburia semicineriana (Swezey, 1913)
Nuritamburia thoracina (Walsingham, 1907)

Taxonomy
Nuritamburia is the replacement name for Bradleyella.

See also
List of Tortricidae genera

References

 , 2007, A replacement name for a Hawaiian moth, Centre for Entomological Studies Miscellaneous Papers 105 (3-4)

External links
tortricidae.com

Archipini
Endemic moths of Hawaii
Tortricidae genera